Bucu is a commune in Ialomița County, Muntenia, Romania. It is situated on the Ialomița River, between Bucharest and Constanța. It is composed of a single village, Bucu.

References

Communes in Ialomița County
Localities in Muntenia